Dennecia “Kayla” Prince (born 10 August 1998) is a Trinidad and Tobago professional footballer who plays as a forward for the Trinidad and Tobago women's national team.

International career
Prince played for Trinidad and Tobago at senior level in the 2020 CONCACAF Women's Olympic Qualifying Championship qualification.

International goals
Scores and results list Trinidad and Tobago' goal tally first.

References

External links

1998 births
Living people
Trinidad and Tobago women's footballers
Women's association football forwards
Campeonato Brasileiro de Futebol Feminino Série A1 players
Trinidad and Tobago women's international footballers
Trinidad and Tobago expatriate women's footballers
Trinidad and Tobago expatriates in Brazil
Expatriate women's footballers in Brazil